Cigutang is a subdistrict of Hetang District in Zhuzhou, Hunan, China. The subdistrict has 14 communities under its jurisdiction. Its seat is Cigutang (茨菇塘).

History
The subdistrict of Cigutang was formed in 1969, it was originally a subdistrict of East District in Zhuzhou. Through the district adjustment of Zhuzhou in 1997, the East District was dissolved, the subdistrict was transferred to Yuetang District formed in the year.

Subdivisions
14 communities
 Changzheng
 Heyetang
 Hongqi
 Hongqilu
 Huangjiatang
 Liulingyi
 Manyuan
 Qianjin
 Qichecheng
 Shangyuetang
 Tian'e
 Xinyuetang
 Yujiachong
 Zuanshi

References

Hetang District
Towns of Hunan